Gabriel Roberge (30 March 1918 – 5 July 2006) was a Liberal party member of the House of Commons of Canada. He was a lawyer by career.

Roberge was born in Saint-Ferdinand d'Halifax, Quebec. He graduated twice from Université Laval, first in 1938 with a Bachelor of Arts then in 1941 with a Bachelor of Law. He served in the military with Le Régiment de la Chaudière reaching the rank of Second Lieutenant in 1941 and left the forces in 1946 as a Captain.

He was first elected at the Mégantic riding in the 1958 general election. After serving one term, the 24th Parliament, he was defeated in the 1962 election by Raymond Langlois of the Social Credit Party. He became a Quebec Superior Court judge in October 1963.

Roberge also helped establish the Kiwanis club in Thetford Mines and was a knight of the Order of Saint Lazarus since 1974. He died on 5 July 2006 in Quebec City.

References

External links
 

1918 births
2006 deaths
Members of the House of Commons of Canada from Quebec
Liberal Party of Canada MPs
Judges in Quebec
Lawyers in Quebec
Université Laval alumni